Chuck Hill is a mountain in Sullivan County, New York. It is located west-southwest of Liberty. Walnut Mountain is located southeast and Revonah Hill is located north-northeast of Chuck Hill.

References

Mountains of Sullivan County, New York
Mountains of New York (state)